Meinert is a surname. Notable people with the surname include:

Dale Meinert (1933–2004), American football player
Frederik Vilhelm August Meinert (1833–1912), Danish zoologist
Maren Meinert (born 1973), German footballer
Niklas Meinert (born 1981), German field hockey player
Walt Meinert (1890–1958), American baseball player

See also
Meinert, Missouri

Surnames from given names